The tenth season of All That aired from early 2005 until late 2005. This is the 4th and final season of the 1st relaunch era. The season aired 10 episodes, beginning with a special to celebrate the 10th anniversary. Approximately 6.2 million total viewers watched the special on both its April 23 and April 24 airings, making it the top cable or broadcast program for the 2-11, 6-11, and 9-14 age demographics.

The intro was similar to Seasons 4 and 5. It featured the cast on a red carpet, they come out of a limo and greet their fans.

The show saw many changes before the start of the season. Shane Lyons left the show after deciding not to renew his contract, while Giovonnie Samuels left because she was getting too old for the cast so she left to make room for new cast members. Jamie Lynn Spears got her own show on Nickelodeon and left the show. Producers hired Kianna Underwood and Denzel Whitaker to replace them.

After a five-year absence, the art of the featured player was brought back to the show. Lil' JJ was brought on as the featured player. Like the last season producers brought back Vital Information which had been absent since the 6th season. Producers got Lil' JJ  to anchor the sketch. However, he would only appear in the sketch and not take part in any other part of the show.

The show was canceled in September 2005 and aired its final episode on October 22. Season 10 was the final season of the show for over a decade until it was announced in 2019 that the show would be coming back for an 11th season.

Cast

Repertory players
Chelsea Brummet
Ryan Coleman
Jack DeSena
Lisa Foiles
Christina Kirkman
Kyle Sullivan
Kianna Underwood
Denzel Whitaker

Featuring
Lil' JJ

Notes

10th anniversary special
The Nickelodeon's All That 10th Anniversary Reunion Special was a television special aired by Nickelodeon to celebrate the 10th anniversary of the sketch comedy series All That. The special was broadcast on April 23 and April 24, 2005 and featured the cast members of All That from both eras, and featuring the "auditions" of two new cast members, and new cast member Lil' JJ's first Vital Information, although some cast members didn't attend.
The special was also watched by 6.2 million viewers.

The Reunion Special was a one-hour event hosted by Frankie Muniz on April 23. Ashanti and Bow Wow were the musical guests. The special had many guest stars and crossover sketches with characters from Seasons 1-6 to Seasons 7-9. Characters from the original era include Principle Pimpell, Coach Kreeton, Detective Dan, Fat Cop, and Good Burger. From the relaunch include Sugar and Coffee, Randy Quench, and Trash 'n Fashion. Bow Wow sings the All That theme song featuring Lisa Foiles, Chelsea Brummet, and Kianna Underwood, which becomes the final segment during the Reunion. 

The last segment of the special paid tribute to the ending soundclip of the original seasons. As the room for the anniversary party was empty, Kenan and Kel stood sleeping in the costumes of their roles as Mavis and Clavis. Kenan woke up and says "Hey, Clavis!, wake up, the show's over," and Kel responds with his signature, "Oh yeah, kick it". They then turn and slowly walk away as the screen fades to black in a dramatic yet subtle ending to the 10 year tribute.

Chronologically, the anniversary special and season 10 of All That were filmed in from October 2004 to February 2005, then Nickelodeon came to air them the following year. After the anniversary ended, season 10 began airing a week later, on April 30, 2005.

Cast

Angelique Bates
Chelsea Brummet
Nick Cannon (was via satellite)
Ryan Coleman
Jack DeSena
Lisa Foiles
Leon Frierson
Giovonnie Samuels
Katrina Johnson
Lil' JJ
Christina Kirkman
Christy Knowings

Kel Mitchell
Alisa Reyes
Mark Saul
Josh Server
Jamie Lynn Spears
Kyle Sullivan
Danny Tamberelli
Kenan Thompson
Kianna Underwood
Denzel Whitaker

Episodes

Special

Unaired episodes

References

External links
 

2005 American television seasons
All That seasons